Dinklage is a town in the district of Vechta, in Lower Saxony, Germany. It is situated approximately 13 km southwest of Vechta, and 45 km north of Osnabrück.

History
Dinklage Castle was built by the counts of the Dersagau of Calvelage around 980; the name Dinklage was first officially recorded in 1231 (first as Thinclage, later Dynclage, and, by 1270, Dinklage). In 1080, the castle was given to the Herren von Dinklage ("lords of Dinklage"), who became the noble family of Dincklage. They tried to establish their own rule in 1372 but were defeated by the bishop of Münster, and the castle was destroyed.

After the lords of Dinklage lost influence, the reconstructed castle was bought in 1667 by Christoph Bernhard, Graf (Count) von Galen, who was bishop of Münster at that time. In 1826, Matthias, Graf (Count) von Galen signed a contract which made Dinklage, which had formerly belonged to the diocese of Münster, a part of the Großherzogtum (Grand Duchy of Oldenburg). The lands of the diocese had been secularized after the war against Napoleon.

The name "Dinklage" comes from the Old Norse word "thing", which means a place of assembly such as for a parliament or a judicial court. The name is as old as the office of "Gaugraf" (district count); "Gaugrafen" were local counts who exercised jurisdiction over a district (Gau), ruling from an assemblies called a "Thing", that traditionally met under a linden tree. The name "Thinclage" appears in a document dated 1231. With the loss of the "th" sound in German, the spelling changed over the years to "Dinclage", and finally to "Dinklage".

Dinklage Castle
King Heinrich I (916–936) founded a mounted army that developed into a group of knights. Moated castles were built to provide refuge in times of war. The Dersgaugraf of Calvelage (today Brockdorf) built a castle at Dinklage around 980. The builder may have been named Heiß Ferdinand.
 Count Bernhard I – 980
 Count Hermann I – 1020
 Count Bernhard II – 1051
 Count Hermann II married Ethelinde, daughter of the heroic Otto of Nordheim, in 1075. The sphere of influence shifted northward and she wanted a larger, more magnificent castle, so they moved to Vechta around 1080. He left the castle to his vassals, who then called themselves the "Lords of Dinklage".

John of Dinklage
In 1231, John of Dinklage and his son Bertram (an armored knight) backed Vechta, which was allied with Emperor Philip of Swabia in a dispute with Otto of Brunswick, who was allied with the Cloppenburg Count von Tecklenburg. Bertram of Dinklage (1200–1251) was 30 years old when he took part in the Sixth Crusade and was a witness to the May 1229 coronation of Frederick II, Holy Roman Emperor as King of Jerusalem. He had two sons, John and Bertram. Bertram, a knight, was a supporter of Otto II of Vechta. Bertram was present at the 1235 wedding of Isabella of England to Emperor Frederick II. Four kings, eleven dukes, thirty counts, many archbishops, and more than twelve thousand knights took part in the wedding.

In 1252, the childless widow Jutta of Tecklenburg sold the country to the Bishop of Münster. Vechta then sank from a residence city to a Drostenstadt, and the country became known as Niederstift Münsterland. John of Dinklage (1258–1290) became the drosten of the district of Vechta; he was in charge of a union of noblemen who were the representatives of the sovereign in the district of Vechta. Beginning in 1258, John was a witness to and guarantor of many negotiations. In 1298, a coat of arms was devised for the lords of Dinklage. It has an upper field with three 5-leaf roses and a lower field with three slanted crosses.

Frederick of Dinklage
Frederick of Dinklage (1350–1396) was not satisfied with the small castle at Dinklage. He used the general decay and insecurity of the empire at the end of the 14th century as an excuse to extort and rob travelling merchants. Frederick and his sons robbed a merchant train and took the merchants to the Fernindandsburg, where they were held hostage for ransom. The wives of the merchants and the Hanseatic League complained about this situation.

In November 1371, the Emperor ordered Florenz, the Prince-Bishop of Münster, to proceed against the castle at Dinklage. Frederick reinforced the castle with twenty ditches and ramparts. The bishop, realizing that he could not conquer the Ferninandsburg alone, sought allies. The bishop of Paderborn, the bishop of Osnabrück, and the counts of Oldenburg, Cloppenburg, and Mark sent reinforcements. On September 15 and 16, 1372, the attack began. The Ferdinandsburg castle, the Vorburg, all of the outbuildings, and the fortifications were completely destroyed.

Frederick and his sons retreated, first to Vechta, then to Diepholz. Frederick died around 1393—in the same year as his sons Statius and Bertrand. In 1383 they were forced to sign an oath pledging never again to build a castle at Dinklage.

Sons of Frederick
In 1393, Bishop Florenz invested the four living sons of Frederick, named Herbord, Dietrich, Hugo, and John, with the former possessions in Dinklage and Vechta. Herbord built the Herbordsburg in about 1400 at the exit of the Ferdinandsburg (today the Rentei). Dietrich built the Dietrichburg (the present day Wasserburg). Hugo built the Hugoburg at the present location of the castle's chapel. Not much is known about the fourth castle, which was built at some other location, possibly in the present town of Dinklage, and soon abandoned. The inhabitants of each castle led their own lives, sharing only the water mill near the Hugoburg. With little property to control, and  an unstable economy and restrictive environment, debts arose, and the lords of Dinklage applied for positions outside their castle.

Martin Luther
In 1543 John of Dinklage supported the reformation of Martin Luther. In 1560 the descendants of Hugo extended their property to a point where they took over the Herbordsburg. The newly acquired castle, called the Frauenburg, often served as a seat for the widow of the Lord in succession times. In 1587 the Dietrichsburg became the property of Kaspar Ledebur, and was renamed the Ledebargshaus. This is the present-day castle. In 1592 the widow Gertrud von Dinklage wed Hermann of Kettler of the House of Assen. Thus the names Herbordsburg, Frauenberg, and Kettersburg all indicate the same castle (today's Rentei). In 1641, during the Thirty Years' War, the sovereign bishop of Münster sent the trusted Heinrich von Galen to Dinklage with the title Count of Vechta. In 1650 Christopher Bernhard von Galen became Prince-Bishop of Münster. The position of his brother, the Drosten Heinrich von Galen of Dinklage, was thus strengthened. In 1671 the Prince-Bishop acquired the entire possessions of the Dinklager. The Herbordsburg was used for the administration of goods, while the Hugoburg contained a storeroom, a courtroom, and two dungeons. The family resided in the Diedrichsburg. In 1677 the sovereign united Dinklage and the peasantry of Brockdorf into a free territory known as a Herrlichkeit, with its own jurisdiction and its own administration.

Thirty Years' War
The Thirty Years' War spread severe misery over the Münsterland; looting and fire devastated many farms, and the land lay uncultivated, the inhabitants having fled or died. Trade ceased. The people and the clergy were demoralized at the war's long duration; their trust in  terrestrial and spiritual authority completely vanished. Churches were neglected, ruined, or were utterly destroyed. Any funds which might have provided for their restoration were lacking because the long war had nearly exhausted church savings. The episcopal vicars general Drs Hartmann, Nikolartius, and Luzenius conducted formal visitations (of inspection) of the parishes of the Niederstift (i.e. the Lower Prince-Bishopric) during the course of the war, in 1618, 1619, 1620, 1625, 1630, and 1644.

After the war, Prince-Bishop Franz Wilhelm of Osnabrück, exercising his spiritual function as a bishop, tried to correct the circumstances of the churches in the Niederstift, which were subject to the Prince-Bishopric of Münster strictly as an aspect of his secular jurisdiction. He either left all the parishes of the districts of Vechta and Cloppenburg under his personal leadership or under the management of episcopal commissioners. According to the visitations conducted in 1651, 1652, 1654, and 1655, the churches in Vechta district were in a sad condition.

The church was restored after the Thirty Years' War, through the intervention of the Drosten von Galen, who transferred his residence to Dinklage. In 1655, records stated: "Everything looks complete and marvelous in the place of worship [...] but unfavorable circumstances have also left much devastation; [and] the paraments and the silver chalice were stolen."

Nineteenth century

In 1803 Dinklage was absorbed into the Duchy of Oldenburg. Dinklage remained the seat of the von Galens' district until the Herrlichkeit ended in 1827. In 1843 the Hugoburg was demolished and a chapel for the castle was built on its site. Many members of the von Galen family served as members of the South Oldenburg Reichstag. Count Clemens August, who served as the bishop of Münster from 1933 to 1946, was born in the castle. He became known as the "Lion Of Münster" and took an active stand against the Nazi government. After World War II the castle became a Benedictine monastery.

Rule of France
At the beginning of the 19th century, Napoleon I attempted to gain control of all of Europe and Germany was an early part of his plans. His armies dominated Austria, Prussia and Russia. Prussia submitted to the Peace of Tilsit (1807), and all areas to the west of the Elbe became part of the newly defined Kingdom of Westphalia under Napoleon's brother Jerome. Napoleon had already established the Rhine Association in 1806, placing under his protectorate sixteen German princes. Pressure was also applied on the Duke of Oldenburg. In 1808, he joined the German princes' Rhine Association. This move by Friedrich Ludwig did not long satisfy the French. On December 13, 1810, they declared that all areas between the North Sea and a certain line became part of the French Empire. The French military confiscated all public treasuries. From Hamburg, the Prefect of Keverberg seized the territory. The duke protested in vain, but had to give up the power on February 26, 1811, and went to St Petersburg at the invitation of Czar Alexander.

On February 28, 1811, the Prefect went to Lambertikirche in Oldenburg and swore allegiance to France. French laws and customs came into force. The personal relationships of the farmers as property owners, the patrimonial jurisdiction, and all facilities of a fief nature were lifted. Civilian records replaced church registers as the official records of the state. French became the official style.

Northern Germany was divided into four departments. One department was the Oberems Department, with Osnabrück as the headquarters. Karl Ludwig Wilhelm of Keverberg served as the Prefect. In this department, there were four arrondissements. A sub-prefect at Quakenbrück governed the area of the former offices Vechta and Cloppenburg. The Arrondissement of Quakenbrück was then divided into 10 cantons. One was the Dinklage Canton, which included the communities of Dinklage, Lohne, and Steinfeld.

At the beginning of the 19th century, the von Galens transferred their home to Westphalia (the House of Assen).

Mayors
Civil leaders called Maire (Mayors) were appointed for the communities. The maire of Dinklage was the former constable, Johann Conrad Böckmann. The maire of Lohne was Karl Heinrich Nieberding. In Steinfeld, the maire was August Hildebrand. The maires were given the responsibility of maintaining public birth, death, and marriage records; this service had formerly been provided by the priests in the community.

The mayors could perform civil weddings. They were also responsible for the supervision and administration of the financial affairs of the community. They supervised conscription and the maintenance of public safety. One difficult task was the supervision and enforcement of the excessive demands of France for the delivery of livestock and grain. This was especially difficult when the levy involved manpower, as in the construction of the Hamburg-Wesel road.

Cattle and taxes
The citizens were subjected to stricter tax-laws and levies. Napoleon's Grande Armée was involved in a war with Russia and required escalating financial support. The following taxes were raised:

 A property tax, based on the value of the property,
 Personal and furniture taxes, based on the number of people and the value of their furniture,
 A livestock tax, based on the type and number of existing animals.

In 1812, the entire community of Dinklage paid a property tax of 1975 francs, a personal and furniture tax of 181 francs, and a livestock tax of 1473 francs. In 1813 the taxes were 1925 Frs., 165.91 Frs. and 1210.43 Frs, respectively. In the Arrondissement of Quakenbrück there were 25 active tax collectors. The collected taxes were delivered to the main tax treasury in Osnabrück.

Livestock, grain, and feed were collected for use by the troops in the cities of Magdeburg and Wittenberg, as illustrated by the following records for the year 1813. On April 8, Dinklage was to deliver 22 head of cattle at 5500 pounds, but only 2690 pounds could be found. A payment of 28 francs per 100 pounds of missing beef was due, but the funds were not immediately available. The 2810 pound shortage had to be settled with money.

On April 29, a new delivery was due in the amount of 100 hundredweight of hay, 105 hundredweight of oats, and 62 hundredweight of straw. In May and June, the community had to deliver 19,421 pounds of wheat-flour and 7050 pounds of rye meal, along with oats, hay and straw to Osnabrück. On June 23, Dinklage was supposed to deliver 25,000 pounds of meat in the form of live cattle to Wittenberg. For this, the community made available 133 head of cattle. On July 6 and 7 a new demand was made for the delivery of 353 hundredweight of wheat and 252 hundredweight of rye in 200 pound sacks to the fortresses at Magdeburg and Wittenberg. For the transportation the community provided 30 wagons each drawn by four horses.

A special financial burden was encumbered by 15 Dinklage citizens in the amount of 2193 francs, 90 centimes for the provisioning of a French honorary guard. Each honorary guard received a special uniform allotment of 150 francs.

Compulsory labour
Road construction and other manual labour were required. In Northern Germany, an obstacle to Napoleon’s plans was the lack of adequate roads for the rapid movement of troops. A highway was planned from Hamburg, by way of Bremen, to Osnabrück and Wesels. Although this was not in Oldenburg, inhabitants from the county of Dinklage were forced to work on the section from Barnstorf to Cornau. The assignment of work was based on the relationship to the land: the Heuerman had one, the Kötter two, the farmer and noblemen four. Also women and children age 12 and over worked with the teams.

Each worker had to supply spades and other tools. A deployment lasted eight days before replacement by another team. The work was reimbursed. A man got  grotes, a woman  grotes, a boy or girl  grotes per day. Marie Böckmann reported on July 4, 1814 that "from March through October of the year 1813 the community Dinklage, for the purpose of transporting soldiers, war ammunition, etc. to Diepholz provided 538 wagons each drawn by four horses plus 600 leader-horses."

Military service
Already in April 1811, the people in Dinklage county were to supply troops for Napoleon. He wanted to subjugate England, and demanded sailors for his warships. On May 7, 1811, 25 young people left Lohne, traveled to Quakenbrück, and then on to Antwerp and Toulon, where they served as sailors on the admiral's ship Commerce de Paris. The French army also required soldiers. On August 28, the district of Quakenbrück provided a contingent of 303 men, including 30 from the Canton Dinklage.

In June 1812, Napoleon moved eastwards with the biggest army in history – 400,000 soldiers, a third of them Germans – to Russia. Many men tried to desert. They punished deserters without leniency. Those who helped deserters were imprisoned for up to six months. Dr. Anton Tapehorn, along with the farmer Hugo Westendorf, hid in Bünne to escape service. Those who deserted escaped from a certain death penalty when Napoleon was defeated in Russia.

Peace courts, judges, servants
French courts of justice and tribunals were established in August 1811. Hamburg was the seat of the imperial court of justice. Each arrondissement received a tribunal of first instance (primary jurisdiction). In each canton, a peace court was established to handle minor infractions. In Dinklage, it was established in the Amtshaus, which later became the first Dinklage hospital. Serving as magistrate was Friedrich Christian Lentz from Höfften, who had previously served as the county court assessor in Vechta. The Canton paid the salary. The Huissier (usher) in Dinklage was the resident Friedrich Christian Harm. As an usher, he was required to deliver court information. The Greffier (court writer) at the peace court was Henricus Antonius Bahlman. He was also a tax collector during the French occupation. The files of the peace court of Dinklage are partially bilingual, with the left half of the page in French and the right in Low German.

On the occasion of the birth of the Emperor’s son, Napoleon II, in March 1811, the inhabitants of Wiek and Dinklage were granted a license to hold a party. They were allowed to dance and amuse themselves as they could at 3:00 in the afternoon on March 31.

Baron Carl Ludwig Wilhelm of Keverberg was born on March 14, 1768, in Haelen in the Flemish part in Lüttich. He belonged to an elegant and affluent family and had studied at Prussian universities. He was chosen as prefect because of his knowledge and experience. During his term of office, he visited the canton of Dinklage. On one such visit in August 1812, he stayed at the Mäkel Inn. The proprietor served the prefect and his companions "6 mugs of Brantwein at 28 Grs., 59 Glasses of Brantwein at 1½ Grs., and 80 mugs of beer at 3 Grs."

Decline of the French Reign
The populace knew about the retreat of the army from Russia and the resulting military casualties. The national resistance of Prussia was awakened, with the King of Prussia allying with Russia against and declaring war on France. Unrest broke in the middle of March 1813 in all of Northern Germany. The Oberems-Department, with the Arrondissement Quakenbrück, was affected when Hamburg was occupied by Russian troops. The sub-prefect in Quakenbrück provided security with Citizen-guards.

In August 1813, Austria joined the Russian-English-Prussian alliance. By October 1813 France faced a large coalition. It would end with Napoleon’s total defeat. On October 15, the Prefect of Keverberg threatened the mayors with release from office if payment of the backlogs and the contributions to the honorary guard were not fulfilled within 24 hours. The population was relieved when the Gendarmerie withdrew from the Arrondissement. The Prefect and his officials left Osnabrück on November 2, 1813.

Duke Peter Friedrich Ludwig of Oldenburg returned from Russia and took control of the government on December 12, 1813. Economic depression necessitated the energetic reconstruction of the entire Oldenburger State. The old laws gradually took effect. The old officials were put in charge again, even if they had served the French. Serfdom remained abolished and a new criminal legal system secured personal freedom for each citizen.

The French presence as foreign masters was felt as a harsh restriction. Heavy taxes and conscription were enormous burdens that brought the country no advantage. This, and the short existence (hardly 3 years) of the Oberems-Department, meant that the French administration was not successful.

Dinklage industry in 1837
The Wiek Dinklage, which was already the industrial centre of the parish in the time of the Herren of Dinklage, also developed into a significant regional centre for trade. Theoder Hörstmann (Contribution to the History S. 42) describes Dinklage in 1837: it lists four distilleries (schnapps), eight breweries, five oil mills, a tobacco factory, one candle factory, three grain mills, 21 merchants and grocers, as well as 223 craftsmen, of whom 85 were rope weavers. The industries began as family businesses and contracted for additional workers, and became known as factories.

Mechanization
The large increase in population, with the resulting expansion of available manpower, brought about mechanization among the craftsmen of Dinklage; the first were the weavers. The brothers van der Wal from the Netherlands wanted to use the existing specialists to place an industrial weaving and printing work near the Mühlenbach (mill brook). In 1837, a corresponding proposition went out to the Amt (government office). Despite some protest from the jurisdiction of Vechta, a dyer named Mertz from Vechta and a calico manufacturer named Bremswig from Bakum were authorized to found businesses.

A second pioneer of the industrialization of Dinklage, in the second half of the century, was the miller and cartwright Bernard Holthaus. He profited from the increasing modernization of agriculture. His machines and appliances found wide sales nationwide and finally led to the foundation of a factory for agricultural machines. It was one of the largest businesses in the entire dukedom in the nineteenth century. The Von Fricken Family of Bomhoff in Vechta Included.Von Fricken Family owners of the largest farm in Vechta known as Gut Bomhof. Baron Von Fricken is owner of an agricultural enterprise (partner Steno). Eduardo Von Fricken resides in Gut Bomhof as of 2022

Emigration
The Mid 19th century saw many local citizen emigrate to escape poverty, particularly in the United States. Particularly popular with Dinklage emigrants were the states of Ohio, Kentucky, Kansas, Michigan, Missouri, Wisconsin, and Illinois. And to Kings County, New York many of the Family of Von Fricken. Brooklyn and some moved to Troy, NY and to many parts of Long Island, NY..James Von Fricken of Smithtown/NY

First local parliament
The first local parliament was established on 1 May 1856. The members of parliament were Mr Renze zu Bahlen (farmer), Mr Többe-Schwegmann (farmer), Mr Klöcker (farmer), Mr Brunkenkel (farmer), Mr Hörstmann (innkeeper), Mr Diers-Bünnemeyer (farmer), Mr Böckmann (farmer), Mr  Sextro (farmer), Mr Schulte (farmer), Mr Hörstmann (farmer), Mr Meyer (farmer), Mr Bornorst (farmer), Mr Niemann (farmer), Mr Hugo (farmer), and Mr Keppel (pharmacist). Johann Ostendorf served as parliamentary head.

Economy
The economy is characterized by farming and the food industry. Industrial facilities and machines, animal feed, furniture and plastic products are also produced.

Statistics

Notable residents
 Clemens August Graf von Galen, Roman Catholic Archbishop of Münster, later Cardinal.

References

External links

 Official site 

Vechta (district)